Rita Kuti-Kis was the defending champion but chose to compete at Waikoloa during the same week, losing in the first round to Adrienn Hegedűs.

Monica Seles won the title by defeating Jelena Dokic 6–3, 6–3 in the final.

Seeds
The first four seeds received a bye to the second round.

Draw

Finals

Top half

Bottom half

References

External links
 Official results archive (ITF)
 Official results archive (WTA)

See also
 Brasil Tennis Cup (WTA event held from 1999 to 2002)

Brasil Open
Women's Singles